Karl Lott (9 September 1901 – 26 August 1922) was a Swiss footballer who played for FC Basel. He played mainly as a forward but also as a midfielder.

Football career
Between the years 1918 and 1921 Lott played a total of 23 games for Basel scoring a total of two goals. 13 of these games were in the Swiss Serie A and 9 were friendly games. He scored one goal in the domestic league and one was scored during the test games.

References

Sources
 Rotblau: Jahrbuch Saison 2017/2018. Publisher: FC Basel Marketing AG. 
 Die ersten 125 Jahre. Publisher: Josef Zindel im Friedrich Reinhardt Verlag, Basel. 
 Verein "Basler Fussballarchiv" Homepage

FC Basel players
Swiss men's footballers
Association football forwards
1901 births
1922 deaths